Melanaema venata is a moth in the family Erebidae. It was described by Arthur Gardiner Butler in 1877. It is found in the Russian Far East (Middle Amur, Primorye, Sakhalin, Kunashir, Shikotan), China (Heilongjiang, Liaonin, Jiangxi), Korea and Japan.

References

Arctiidae genus list at Butterflies and Moths of the World of the Natural History Museum

Moths described in 1877
Nudariina